The Avalon Regal Theater (originally the Avalon Theater, and later the New Regal Theater) is a music hall located at 1641 East 79th Street, bordered by the Avalon Park and South Shore neighborhoods on the south side of Chicago, Illinois, United States. It is a noted venue for African-American performers. The theater opened in August 1927.

History

Structure
Architecturally, the Avalon Regal's  atmospheric and Moorish Revivalist theme was conceived by Austrian-born architect John Eberson, who was nationally known for his exotic motifs. Legend has it that Eberson  was inspired by an ornate Persian incense burner he found in an antique market in the French Quarter of New Orleans.

Usage

The theater opened as the Avalon Theater on August 29, 1927, when the community was known as Avalon Park, a then predominantly German, Swedish and Irish neighborhood. At the time of its opening, The theater served as a live-performing arts venue until 1934. During the 1960s, more African Americans began to move into the area around the theater, transforming local culture while taking advantage of this historic gem for their unique musical and artistic ends.

The theater was later in business, only showing motion pictures from 1935 until its closing in 1967. When the theater was sold in 1970, It served as the Miracle Temple Church and a meeting place for 14 years. In 1985, The building was purchased by Edward and Bettiann Gardner, the founders of Soft Sheen Products. The Gardner's renovated and reopened the theater as a performing arts venue two years later. At that time, the Gardners renamed the theater The New Regal Theater. The name was in honor of the old Regal Theater in Bronzeville, a celebrated cultural center for Chicago's African American community beginning in the 1920s. The old Regal Theater, located at 4719 South Martin Luther King Jr. Drive caught fire in September 1971 was later demolished in 1973. In May 1987, the theater received a $1 million dollar grant for renovations from Illinois Development Action Grant program under mayor Harold Washington administration. The grant was part of a financial package totaling $4.1 million. The theater received Chicago Landmark status on June 17, 1992. After 18 years, the Gardner's closed the theater due to low-attendance and operational cost of the building in June 2003.

The theater was later purchased by Regina Evans, Country Club Hills, Illinois police chief in 2008 with the help of state fund of $2.36 million dollars with the hope of reviving it as a cultural venue. Evans secured a state loan for $1.25 million dollars for renovations to the theater but Evans used the funds for personal use. The site did hold a party to celebrate Barack Obama's presidential nomination acceptance speech in August 2008. The theater was foreclosed and the Federal Deposit Insurance Corp. acquired the theater in 2011. It was later sold to Community Capital Investment, LLC. Jerald Gary, president and chief investment officer of Community Capital Investment Partners, LLC purchased the theater for $100,000 in a foreclosure deal in 2010 or February 2014. In September 2018, Rapper and Chicago native Kanye West committed to help restore the theater, pledging to donate $1 million dollars.

Chicago Regal and Architecture Foundation
The Chicago Regal Foundation 501(c)(3) was created to raise funds needed to reopen and operate it  The Foundation plans to recreate pivotal moments in entertainment history using holographic stage technology. The theater regularly participates in the Chicago Architecture Foundation's yearly event, Open House Chicago. This annual opportunity allows visitors to tour the interior of the building for free.

Notable performers 
Jay Zee

References

External links

Chicago Landmarks
Recent interior photographs by Matt Lambros

Theatres completed in 1927
Theatres in Chicago
Chicago Landmarks
Moorish Revival architecture in Illinois
Atmospheric theatres
John Eberson buildings